Dr Andrew Robert Jack (age ) is the former Chief Censor of New Zealand. He held the position from March 2011 to March 2017.

Jack grew up in Howick, Auckland. His mother was a radiographer; his father was a school teacher who had emigrated from Northern Ireland. He has earned at least five degrees, including a PhD in law (supervised by Bill Hastings), a master's degree in public policy, and degrees in ancient history and classical Greek. He also holds qualifications in teaching English as a second language, quantity surveying, and diamond grading.

Prior to becoming Chief Censor, Jack had been group manager of the legal and advisory services at New Zealand Customs Service and chief legal advisor for the New Zealand Police.

His work during his time as chief censor included the Classification Office banning objectionable slogans and artwork on Wicked campervans. He said in an interview, "These are four-foot high mobile billboards advocating the consumption of illicit drugs using characters that are understood, attractive and recognised by children and that's just not OK."

As of 2016, Jack lived in Vogeltown, Wellington with his wife Jan and their three dogs.

References

"New Chief Censor appointed", 3 News, 3news.co.nz, 22 December 2010.
Sharon Stephenson, "Keeping an eye on what we see", New Zealand Herald, 14 December 2013.

External links
"Structure and Staff at the Classification Office", classificationoffice.govt.nz.

Chief Censors of New Zealand
20th-century New Zealand lawyers
People educated at Pakuranga College
Year of birth missing (living people)
People from Auckland
University of Auckland alumni
Living people